"I'll Wait" is a song by Van Halen from the album 1984. 

I'll Wait may also refer to:

 "I'll Wait (Kygo and Sasha Sloan song)", a song by Kygo and Sasha Sloan from the album Golden Hour
 "I'll Wait", a song by Sara Groves from the album Invisible Empires

See also
 I'll Wait for You (disambiguation)